Urey Woodson (August 16, 1859 - August 7, 1939) was a Kentucky Democrat and a newspaper editor and publisher.

Biography
He was the Kentucky railroad commissioner from 1891 to 1895. He was a member of Democratic National Committee from Kentucky from 1896 to 1912, from 1916 to 1918, and from 1924 to 1928. He was a delegate to the Democratic National Convention from Kentucky in 1932. A Presbyterian, he died on August 7, 1939 and was buried in Elmwood Cemetery in Owensboro, Kentucky.

External links
Urey Woodson from the Library of Congress at Flickr Commons

References

1859 births
1939 deaths
Editors of Kentucky newspapers
Kentucky Democrats
People from Madisonville, Kentucky